The Atatürk Museum (Mousío Atatúrk, Atatürk House Museum) is a historic house museum in Thessaloniki, Central Macedonia, Greece.

Overview
The house is the birthplace of the founder of modern Turkey, Mustafa Kemal Atatürk, who was born here in 1881. It is a three-floor house with a courtyard on 24 Apostolou Pavlou Street, next to the Turkish Consulate.

There are four rooms on the ground floor. On the 1st floor is the reception room, with European sofas, a large console table, and a chased brazier; a large sitting-room, with low banquettes around the walls; Kemal's mother's room, with a bed, a banquette, and a trunk; and the kitchen, equipped with contemporary cooking utensils. The most impressive room on the 2nd floor is the one in which Kemal was born, a large room with a banquette, his desk, and a large brazier. It faces another room, in which some of Kemal's personal effects from Ankara are displayed. These include formal dress, smoking requisites, cutlery, cups, and other items. All the documents relating to Kemal's schooldays have been hung on the walls. A pomegranate tree planted by Kemal's father still grows in the courtyard.

The building was repaired in 1981 and was repainted to its original pink. Most of the furniture is authentic. Any missing items were replaced with furniture from Kemal's mausoleum and from Topkapi Palace in Istanbul. There are photographs on all the walls of Kemal at various periods of his life.

History
Before the capture of Thessaloniki by the Greek Army in 1912, it was known as "Koca Kasım Paşa district, Islahhane street". It was built before 1870 and in 1935 the Thessaloniki City Council gave it to the Turkish State, which decided to convert it into a museum dedicated to Mustafa Kemal Atatürk. Until the Istanbul pogrom of 1955, the street in front of the house was named "Kemal Ataturk".

In September 1955 as the Cyprus EOKA crisis unleashed in the Mediterranean island, a bomb exploded close to the Turkish consulate damaging also the Atatürk Museum. 

The damage was minimal with some broken windows; However, the conservative and more religious DP Menderes government at the time provoked and exaggerated the event to cause unrest due to the Cypriot crisis, which then state-supported organizations started targeting Greek communities around the country, specifically Istanbul. It ultimately marked the beginning of an anti-Greek pogrom in Istanbul, resulting clashes between Greek and Turkish communities in the city throughout September 1955.

The DP government would be overthrown in 1960 by the Turkish Armed Forces, and Menderes executed in 1961.

In 1981, a replica of the house was built in Ankara.

Gallery

References

External links 
www.museumsofmacedonia.gr
www.studylanguages.org

Museums in Thessaloniki
Historic house museums in Greece
Thessaloniki
Museums established in 1953
1953 establishments in Greece
Ottoman architecture in Thessaloniki
Istanbul pogrom